The Thrill of It All is a four-CD compilation box set by the British band Roxy Music, released by Virgin in 1995 (see 1995 in music). The first three discs of the set collected key album tracks from the band's eight studio albums. The fourth disc consists of a selection of singles, B-sides and remixes. Many of the B-sides were composed by other members of the band as Bryan Ferry wanted each member of the band to benefit from songwriting royalties. The release features no previously unreleased tracks, though it was the first time some tracks were released on compact disc. The set was remastered by Robert Ludwig who subsequently did the 1999 remasters for the Roxy Music catalogue.

Track listing
All tracks are written by Bryan Ferry, except where noted.

References

1995 compilation albums
Roxy Music compilation albums
Virgin Records compilation albums